WNB or wnb may refer to:

 Wednesday Night Baseball, a live game telecast of Major League Baseball
 Western National Bank, a defunct bank based in Texas, United States
 WNB, the station code for Warrnambool railway station, Victoria, Australia
 wnb, the ISO 639-3 code for Wanambre language, Papua New Guinea